Hurricane Smith is a 1941 American action film directed by Bernard Vorhaus and written by Robert Presnell Sr.. The film stars Ray Middleton, Jane Wyatt, Harry Davenport, J. Edward Bromberg, Henry Brandon and Casey Johnson. The film was released on July 20, 1941, by Republic Pictures.

Plot
Hurricane Smith is a rodeo rider, who is wrongly convicted of murder and robbery, but escapes and creates a new start for himself. However one of the real criminals shows up to, since he believes that Smith has some of his loot.

Cast 
Ray Middleton as 'Hurricane' Smith
Jane Wyatt as Joan Bradley
Harry Davenport as Robert Ingersoll Reed
J. Edward Bromberg as 'Eggs' Bonelli
Henry Brandon as Sam Carson 
Casey Johnson as Johnny Smith
Frank Darien as 'Pop' Wessell
Charles Trowbridge as Mark Harris
Howard Hickman as Sen. Bradley
Emmett Vogan as Prosecuting Attorney

References

External links
 

1941 films
American action films
1940s action films
Republic Pictures films
Films directed by Bernard Vorhaus
American black-and-white films
1940s English-language films
1940s American films